Hannibal Sehested (16 November 1842 – 19 September 1924) was Danish landowner and Council President from 27 April 1900 to 24 July 1901 as the leader of the Cabinet of Sehested. He was the last Danish Council President appointed by the king without support from the Danish Parliament before Denmark switched to a parliamentary system and the secret ballot.

Biography
Sehested was born at Gudme on the island of Funen, Denmark. 
He was the son of  Niels Frederik Bernhard Sehested and his wife Charlotte Christine Linde. 
He became a student at Herlufsholm School in 1860 and graduated from the University of Copenhagen in 1869.
In 1886 he was elected to the County Council and represented the  Højre party  for the 6th County Council until 1910. 
Sehested took over  Stamhuset Broholm in 1894. He was made a Knight of the Order of the Dannebrog 1891, Dannebrogsmand 1898, Commander of the 1st Degree 1901 and Grand Cross Knight 1901.

References

1842 births
1924 deaths
People from Svendborg Municipality
University of Copenhagen alumni 
Prime Ministers of Denmark
Foreign ministers of Denmark
Members of the Landsting (Denmark)

19th-century Danish politicians
20th-century Danish politicians
 Knights of the  Order of the Dannebrog

People educated at Herlufsholm School